Abu Kahf Subdistrict  is a subdistrict of Manbij District in Aleppo Governorate of northern Syria. Administrative centre is the village Abu Kahf.

The subdistrict was formed in 2009, when the southern part of Manbij Subdistrict was split apart. At the 2004 census, the villages of the subdistrict had a total population of 19,964.

Cities, towns and villages

References 

Manbij District
Abu Kahf